Tetrapoma is a monotypic genus of hydrozoans belonging to the family Campanulinidae. The only species is Tetrapoma quadridentatum.

The species is found in America and Arctic regions.

References

Campanulinidae
Hydrozoan genera
Monotypic cnidarian genera